Annette Celia Genevieve Zilinskas is an American musician. She is a founding member of The Bangles and returned to the band in 2018 after an absence of 35 years. Zilinskas has also been the lead vocalist for Blood on the Saddle, and was a member of Los Angeles bands Weather Bell, The Ringling Sisters, and Medicine.

A native of Southern California, Zilinskas was born in Van Nuys and was recruited into The Bangs, which later became The Bangles, as bass guitarist. She played bass and harmonica on The Bangles' eponymously titled 5-track EP, but left the band to join Blood on the Saddle as lead singer before The Bangles' first album. After her departure, Michael Steele became the bass player for the band. Zilinskas started joining the Bangles for live shows again in 2014, before she rejoined The Bangles as a member again in 2018.

References

External links
 
 

Women bass guitarists
American women rock singers
People from Van Nuys, Los Angeles
Living people
American bass guitarists
The Bangles members
American people of Lithuanian descent
Guitarists from Los Angeles
20th-century American guitarists
21st-century American women singers
21st-century American singers
20th-century American women guitarists
1962 births